Salinifilum is a genus of bacteria within the family Pseudonocardiaceae.

References

Pseudonocardiales
Bacteria genera